Metrolink is the commuter rail system serving Los Angeles, California, United States and the greater Los Angeles area of Southern California. The system is governed by the Southern California Regional Rail Authority and operated under contract by Amtrak, serving five counties in the region—Orange, Los Angeles, Riverside, San Bernardino, and Ventura—as well as Oceanside in San Diego County. In addition, Metrolink also operates the  Arrow hybrid rail line in San Bernardino County, under a contract with the San Bernardino County Transportation Authority, integrating another three stations to its network.

Lines

Stations

Future stations

Notes

References

Metrolink (California)
Lists of commuter rail stations
Metrolink